The climate of Faisalabad features a semi-arid climate (BSh) in Köppen-Geiger classification with very hot and humid summers and dry cool winters.

The summer season starts in mid-April and continues until late October. May and June are the hottest months, while July, August and the first half of September can be oppressively humid, except for the days when it rains. June is the hottest month in Faisalabad, when conditions are dry and dust storms are common. The coldest month is January, which is also a dry month with significant foggy days. The fog is particularly dense at night and in early morning hours. The winter season starts in November and continues until early February. Spring begins after mid-February and lasts usually until late March, when temperatures begin to rise and conditions become drier and sunnier.

Weather extremes
The record 24-hour rainfall stands at a massive  recorded on 5 September 1961, which is roughly 70 percent of the city's annual average rainfall. The highest wind gust ever recorded in Faisalabad occurred during a severe dust-thunderstorm on 2 June 2000, when the maximum wind speed reached .

Wind
Apart from temperature and rainfall records, the winds in Faisalabad are generally light. The city lies in an area with low wind speeds. Westerly breeze dominates the afternoons, while the nights are calm. South east / easterly winds are common here during the monsoon season. Faisalabad, being in the plains, can experience severe thunderstorms and high wind gusts that can be damaging to its crops.

See also
 Climate of Lahore
 Climate of Rawalpindi
 Climate of Islamabad
 List of extreme weather records in Pakistan

References

Faisalabad
Faisalabad